Vikes may refer to:

Canada 
 Victoria Vikes, sports teams of the University of Victoria in British Columbia

United States 
 Vikes, a nickname for the Cleveland State Vikings, sports teams of Cleveland State University, Ohio 
 Vikes, a nickname for the Minnesota Vikings, an American football team in the NFL based in Minneapolis